İbrahimhapıt (also, İbrahim Haput, Ibragim-Gaput, and Ibragimgapyt) is a former village in the Quba Rayon of Azerbaijan.

References

External links

Populated places in Quba District (Azerbaijan)